Adam Jensen is a fictional character in the Deus Ex series, the player character of Eidos Montréal's Deus Ex: Human Revolution (2011) and Deus Ex: Mankind Divided (2016). Initially an ex-cop turned Chief of Security for Sarif Industries, Jensen is mortally wounded at the beginning of Human Revolution by an assault on the facilities. As part of his contract Jensen is forcibly "augmented" with mechanical parts that replace much of his body. Over the course of the game, Jensen tries to uncover the identity of those behind the attack. Mankind Divided follows a few years after the events of the game, where Jensen is tasked with hunting down and capturing augmented terrorists.

Jensen is a character that allows the player to impose their own opinion of augmentation, and in Mankind Divided is presented as an outsider to both the augmented and the unaugmented. His visual appearance went through various designs, ultimately taking two and a half years to fully materialize in two separate appearances for social and combat clothes. Mankind Divided revisited the design, working with an external clothing company. In both games, Elias Toufexis voices the character.

Outside of the games, Adam has also appeared in various tie-in media, and debuted in a comic series leading up to Human Revolutions release. He is a central character of said comic series as well as Black Light and Children's Crusade, and appears in some form in The Dawning Darkness and Hard Line.

Appearances

2011: Human Revolution game and tie-in comic
In the lead-up to the Human Revolutions release, a six-issue limited comic series ran from February to July. Jensen comes into conflict with the former-SWAT commander he served under, Durant, who now works as an augmented mercenary. Jensen ultimately kills Durant.

Adam next appeared as the player character in Human Revolution the game, in August. At the game's beginning, Jensen is the unaugmented head of security of Sarif Industries, a company focused on developing and researching augmentations. An attack on the facility seemingly kills Megan Reed (Adam's ex-girlfriend and head of neuro-scientific research at Sarif Industries) and leaves Adam near death. As part of his employment contract his boss, David Sarif, is allowed to heavily augment him as part of the attempts to save his life. Throughout the game, at Sarif's behest Jensen attempts to investigate the attack and its purpose, ultimately uncovering that the attack was orchestrated by the Illuminati and that Megan and the other scientists were kidnapped, not killed. In the end, Adam succeeds in rescuing Megan along with several of the other scientists, and he destroys the "Hyron Project"—an Illuminati supercomputer powered by human brains. However, Hugh Darrow, the creator of human augmentation and a rogue Illuminati member, releases a signal, from an arctic facility designed to end global warming named Panchea, that turns the vast majority of augmented people berserk; Adam manages to shut it down, but not before much loss of life. Depending on the player's choice, Jensen may either broadcast a message explaining (falsely or not) the events that happened in order to shape public opinion, or destroy the facility and leave mankind to find the answers for themselves.

Elsewhere in the game, Adam's backstory is explored through a series of sidequests. As an infant Jensen was part of a group of babies that genetic therapy experiments were performed on. Adam was the sole survivor of the treatments, and two scientists decided to burn the labs down to stop the experiments. A nurse at the labs rescued Adam and gave him to a couple, who secretly and unofficially adopted him.

In October, a piece of downloadable content called The Missing Link was released, detailing Jensen's experience after leaving Hengsha in cryosleep in part of the main game.

2016–2017: Mankind Divided and associated media
From February to June 2016, a comic named Deus Ex Universe: Children's Crusade followed Jensen's actions in the events leading up to Mankind Divided, and he was the player character in Deus Ex Go, released in August. Later that month, Mankind Divided came out, along with Black Light, a novel that focused on Jensen and Francis Pritchard during the aftermath of the first game's ending.

Mankind Divided takes place two years after Human Revolution, with Jensen now working as part of Interpol's anti-terrorist team Task Force 29. Jensen is also working with Alex Vega, a member of the secretive hacktivist Juggernaut Collective, to investigate the Illuminati's role in or control over TF29 and Interpol. Shortly near the game's start, a bomb is set off at a train station, and Jensen and TF29 are tasked to investigate it and other recent attacks. Ultimately, Jensen either arrests or kills Viktor Marchenko, an augmented Illuminati pawn who is acting as a terrorist to help drum up support for a United Nations resolution called the Human Restoration Act, intended to allow the Illuminati further control over the mechanically augmented.

The game would receive two pieces of downloadable content (DLC) that added new campaigns, both of which have Adam return as the player character. System Rift, released September 2016, involves Jensen attempting to break into and access files from Palisade Blade-01, a data-archiving site world-renowned for its security, at the behest of Pritchard. The second DLC, A Criminal Past, was released February 2017 and involves Jensen recounting his first undercover mission for TF29 to his psychiatrist as a frame story. Entering a high-security prison for augmented individuals as an inmate, Jensen attempts to find and retrieve another undercover agent in order to help stop several potential terrorist attacks, though the player may ultimately have Adam kill him when he begins to threaten another inmate's life.

Character

Personality and development

Jensen has a deliberately defined personality and backstory, though his "present and future" are left up to the player. Prior to his augmentation, Jensen had been someone who had yet to decide whether he wanted to get augmented or not. The removal of his choice in the matter, and the permanent consequences of it, were considered a "defining part of his character". Narrative designer Mary DeMarle commented on a "fine line" when balancing Jensen's defined personality with player choice. As Jensen is unsure how he feels himself, the player chooses how he feels within the game. His Human Revolution character bio, on the official Deus Ex website, characterizes him as "a loner" and someone who "instinctively looks for answers for himself first, consulting others only after his own ideas are exhausted". He has "centered most of his life and career choices around taking care of others".

Initially, Mary DeMarle wanted to kill off Jensen for Mankind Divided, though he was ultimately brought back as player character oncemore. In the sequel, Adam is an "outcast" to both the augmented and "naturals" (unaugmented people), allowing players to see "both sides of the debate". In contrast to his more ambivalent view in Human Revolution, the Jensen of Mankind Divided has accepted his nature as "a tool and a weapon" and must decide what to do with it. His newfound metaphorical "ownership" of his augmentations is intended to be reflected by Mankind Divideds "increased fluidity" when it comes to his powers. Kotaku's Riley MacLeod noted Jensen's more relaxed nature about his augmentations, contrasting his shower and shirtless video call with Sarif with the broken mirror found in Human Revolution. MacLeod writes: "He seems comfortable in his skin, or at least resigned to it".

Visual design

The character took two and half years to design for Human Revolution, going through many designs considered "extremely bad" by art director Jonathan Jacques-Belletete. Much of Human Revolution was designed to blend both cyberpunk and Renaissance-inspired styles, something which extended to Jensen; developers began using the term "cyberrenaissance". For instance, the character's ultimate design has a "Don Quixote" goatee and his coat displays a subtle Renaissance pattern. Developers wanted Adam's design to reflect the transhumanist themes of the game, showing both "the physical and aesthetic results" of his heavy body augmentation. Jensen's design is intended to deliberately avoid being a "big brutish dude" in the vein of characters like Marcus Fenix. A resemblance between Adam and Jacques-Belletete has been noted by sources. Jacques-Belletete was not intentionally chosen as a model for the character; however, he did pose for one of the game's posters.

In the released Human Revolution, Jensen makes use of two costumes: his standard coat, used for "urban exploration" and "social missions", and a commando suit used for infiltration missions. Splitting these into two designs was a late decision in crafting Adam's look, with developers spending much time struggling to create a single design that could both fit in with either while adhering to the game's artistic style. Further complicating this was their wish to ensure Adam's cybernetic arms were always on display. Until then, his design went through numerous stages, including what was dubbed a "douchebag Adam", where developers focused too much on making him "too tough, too 'badass, and a "Pinocchio Adam", with flesh-colored arms making him look like "a living mannequin". Shifting to two designs had "major consequences" on the game's production, game systems and budget. His final trenchcoat would go through a few variations, including a shorter version in order to move away from cyberpunk cliché — though this version was dropped after a studio-wide vote between the longer and shorter options.

Jensen's coat in Mankind Divided used his original as a "starting point". After trying to design a new coat internally developers decided to, in contrast to the original Human Revolution, collaborate with an external design company, Acronym. His new coat was desired to be "complex, yet functional", whilst remaining "unique, desirable, and sleek". Acronym co-founder Errolson Hugh worked with developers in creating the design. Acronym were given much material related to Human Revolution to guide them and the coat was designed to be functional in the real-world, to the point that a model of the coat was created. Other elements were continued from Human Revolution. Mankind Divided art director Martin Dubeau comments: "Inside of his coat there's a Renaissance pattern. It's like the Renaissance is still close to his heart, but he doesn't show it to anyone". His outfit is intended look more "military" in the second game, reflecting his work as part of an anti-terrorist organization.

Portrayal
Elias Toufexis was chosen to voice the character, who also did motion capture for lines during conversations and other cinematics. Toufexis had to balance and "justify" the various alternate approaches and dialogue the player could say, something he found "a challenge, but [...] a lot of fun". The actor gave Jensen a "little deeper, more purposeful and monotone" voice than his own, both in homage to the original Deus Exs JC Denton and to allow the player to "imprint" their own personality on Jensen. Descriptions provided to Toufexis called Jensen "kind of a Clint Eastwood character". It took time for Toufexis to fully settle on Adam's voice, leading to certain scenes shot earlier, such as the confrontation with police officer Wayne Haas, sounding different in tone. Toufexis returned to voice the character in the sequel, this time insisting on doing heavier performance capture for the character.

Reception

Listing him as 2011's best new game character, Destructoid's Ryan Perez gave praise to the design of his apartment and how it showed off the character's inner conflict. Jack Devries of IGN, meanwhile, criticized the character's look for having drab color tones and insulted his "fauxhawk".

See also
Transhumanism in fiction

References

Cyborg characters in video games
Fictional American people in video games
Fictional characters from Detroit
Fictional Interpol officials
Fictional police officers in video games
Fictional security guards
Hackers in video games
Male characters in video games
Role-playing video game characters
Science fiction video game characters
Square Enix protagonists
Video game characters introduced in 2011